James Clarence Irwin (June 7, 1929 – March 21, 2018) was a vice admiral in the United States Coast Guard who served as Vice Commandant from 1986 to 1988. He had been commander of the 5th Coast Guard District and Chief of the Office of Reserve at Headquarters, Coast Guard. After his term as vice commandant, he served as Commander, Joint Task Force FOUR (a predecessor agency to Joint Interagency Task Force South) and Coast Guard Atlantic Area (appointed 1989) and U.S. Maritime Defense Zone Atlantic (from 1988 to 1989).

Personal life 
Irwin was born in Des Moines, Iowa, and was married to La Verne Marie Grapski.

References

1929 births
2018 deaths
People from Des Moines, Iowa
Military personnel from Iowa
United States Coast Guard admirals
Vice Commandants of the United States Coast Guard